Conversations with Queen is the second album by rapper, Queen Pen. The album was released on May 22, 2001, on Motown Records and was executive produced by Kedar Massenburg and Queen Pen. Conversations with Queen was less successful than her previous album My Melody, only making it to number 134 on the Billboard 200 and number 31 on the Top R&B/Hip-Hop Albums. One single was released, "Ghetto Divorce", but it did not make it to the charts.

Track listing
Credits adapted from the album's liner notes.

Sample credits
 "Pussy Ain't for Free" contains a sample from "Put Your Body In It", performed by Stephanie Mills; written by Howard Terrance King and Edward Dennis Moore.
 "QP Walks" contains a sample of "Sally" performed by Stetsasonic.
 "Revolution" contains an interpolation of "Revolution", written by Bob Marley.
 "For You" embodies portions of "I'll Do Anything for You", written by Ron Miller and Bert Reid.
 "True" contains an interpolation from "True", written by Gary Kemp.
 "Who's The" contains a sample of "Don't Stop 'Til You Get Enough, written and performed by Michael Jackson.

Charts

References

2001 albums
Queen Pen albums
Motown albums
Albums produced by Teddy Riley
Albums produced by Daddy-O (musician)